Manson Howard Gibson (born May 5, 1963) is a retired American kickboxer and a 12-time world champion in kickboxing and Muay Thai. He was known for his vicious use of spinning techniques and wild, unpredictable style, mixing elements of kickboxing, Taekwondo and Northern Praying Mantis martial arts. He was sometimes referred to as the "Thai Killer" or the "Black Bruce Lee". Gibson was one of America's greatest kickboxers, and is credited with over 100 wins and more than 80 KOs, including around 40 via headkick.

Biography and career
After a series of early career wins and claiming titles such as the K.I.C.K. Super Middleweight World Championship, Gibson found the competition at home (aside from two losses to Rick Roufus) uninspiring.  So in the late 1980s and well into the 1990s, while many American fighters were fighting one another for a multitude of so-called "world titles", Manson headed across to Japan where he fought and beat top fighters such as Caesar Takeshi, Tosca Petridis and Changpuek Kiatsongrit, often fighting under different rule sets such as Shoot Boxing, K-1 and Muay Thai.

During his period spent fighting in Japan, Gibson entered the inaugural K-2 Grand Prix in 1993.  K-2 was a short lived series of tournaments held by the K-1 organization for Light Heavyweights and the 1993 event was held in Tokyo.  In the tournament quarter finals he faced the highly decorated Ernesto Hoost, with Hoost, the recent K-1 Heavyweight Grand Prix runner-up, the strong favorite and on his way to becoming a legend.  Gibson proved in that fight that he could hang with the world's best, knocking Hoost down with his trademark spinning backfist. However, despite the knockdown, the match went to an extra round where Gibson again knocked down Hoost, this time with a sidekick. Gibson lost a split decision.

Gibson returned to the United States around 1998, defeating a legend in Coban Lookchaomaesaitong. The match in Compton, was one in which Gibson had the MC announce himself as the "Thai Killer" and at the end of the fight did back flips next to the prone Coban. That year Gibson also won the I.K.K.C. Muaythai world title by defeating Maurice Travis, also in Los Angeles. Over the next couple of years he would defend his I.K.K.C. world title four more times with the highlight being a second victory over seven-time World Champion Changpuek Kiatsongrit – although as with the Coban fight his match antics left a sour taste in the mouth.

On April 7, 2000 Gibson won the I.K.F. Pro Muay Thai Rules Light Cruiserweight North American title in Green Bay Wisconsin when he defeated Phil Petit of Sik Tai, Winnipeg, Manitoba, Canada by KO with a spinning backfist in the first round. Gibson retired his title in 2005 when he moved up in weight. When Gibson won this title it was called the Light Cruiserweight title but the weightclass was different: 175.1 lbs. - 182 lbs. The weightclass range was later changed but Gibson's title remained Light Cruiserweight.

Around 2002 age started catching up with Gibson who was approaching his forties and he lost his I.K.K.C. world title to Frenchman Manu N'toh. A win against Heath Harris in 2004 for the I.K.K.C. proved he could still be competitive, although his opponent Harris had only had a handful of professional fights prior to the encounter. Always one to try different fighting styles Gibson had a brief foray into MMA in 2006.  By the end of 2009, with the losses stacking up after a series of unsuccessful title fights, Gibson retired.

Titles

2004 I.K.K.C. Pro Muay Thai Light Heavyweight World Champion −81.3 kg
1999 I.K.F. Pro Muay Thai Light Cruiserweight North American Champion −84.5 kg
1998–02 I.K.K.C. Muay Thai Light Heavyweight World Champion (Four title defenses)
1989 Shoot boxing Hawk Class World Champion −75 kg
Ring Fighting Arts World Champion
U.K.F. Super Middleweight World Champion
K.I.C.K. Light Heavyweight Champion
K.I.C.K. Super Middleweight World Champion
W.A.K.O. (PRO) Super Middleweight World Champion
W.K.A. Super Middleweight World Champion
I.K.L. Middleweight Champion

Kickboxing record

|-
|-  bgcolor="#FFBBBB"
| 2009-12-05 || Loss ||align=left| Shawn Yarborough || WCK Muay Thai @ Buffalo Bill's || Primm, NV, USA || TKO (Quit) || 2 || 3:00
|-
! style=background:white colspan=9 |
|-
|-  bgcolor="#FFBBBB"
| 2008-06-18 || Loss ||align=left| Edwin Aguilar || Muay Thai Fight Night || Montego Bay, Jamaica || TKO (Quit) || 3 || 3:00
|-
! style=background:white colspan=9 |
|-
|-  bgcolor="#FFBBBB"
| 2007-07-07 || Loss ||align=left| Denis Grachev || Hot Summer Fights || Inglewood, CA, USA || TKO (Corner Stop/Knees) || 3 || 0:27
|-
! style=background:white colspan=9 |
|-
|-  bgcolor="#FFBBBB"
| 2004-11-20 || Loss ||align=left| Clifton Brown || Matter of Pride 8 || Los Angeles, CA, USA || TKO (Leg Kicks) || 4 ||
|-
! style=background:white colspan=9 |
|-
|-  bgcolor="#CCFFCC"
| 2004-10-21 || Win ||align=left| Heath Harris || Guts and Glory || San Bernardino, CA, USA || Decision (Unanimous) || 5 || 3:00
|-
! style=background:white colspan=9 |
|-
|-
|-  bgcolor="#CCFFCC"
| 0000-00-00 || Win ||align=left| Bill Rastafar || || United States || KO (Left Hook)|| 1 ||
|-
|-  bgcolor="#CCFFCC"
| 2003-00-00 || Win ||align=left| Wrath White || || United States || Decision (Unanimous) || 3 || 3:00
|-
|-  bgcolor="#FFBBBB"
| 2002-11-15 || Loss ||align=left| Manu N'toh || W.C.K. "A Matter of Pride VI" || Victorville, CA, USA || Decision (Unanimous) || 5 || 3:00
|-
! style=background:white colspan=9 |
|-
|-  bgcolor="#FFBBBB"
| 2002-03-23 || Loss ||align=left| Nick Karagiannidis || Master Toddy Show @ Stardust Casino || Las Vegas, NV, USA || Decision || 5 || 3:00
|-
|-  bgcolor="#CCFFCC"
| 2001-12-14 || Win ||align=left| Changpuek Kiatsongrit || W.C.K. @ Palms Casino Resort || Las Vegas, NV, USA || KO (Spinning Heel Kick) || 2 || 
|-
! style=background:white colspan=9 |
|-
|-  bgcolor="#FFBBBB"
| 2000-12-02 || Loss ||align=left| Robert Sarkozi || 10th World Shidokan Invitational, Quarter Finals || Chicago, IL, USA || DQ (Constant Fouling) || 4 || 
|-
|-  bgcolor="#CCFFCC"
| 2000-07-04 || Win ||align=left| Phil Petit || Stadium View Sports Bar || Green Bay, WI, USA || KO (Spinning Back Fist) || 1 || 
|-
! style=background:white colspan=9 |
|-  bgcolor="#FFBBBB"
| 1999-09-11 || Loss ||align=left| Richard Stellwagen || Summer Brawl || Franklin Park, IL, USA || Decision (Split) || 8 || 2:00
|-
! style=background:white colspan=9 |
|-
|-  bgcolor="#CCFFCC"
| 1998-07-07 || Win ||align=left| Coban Lookchaomaesaitong || Crystal Park Casino Outdoor Show || Los Angeles, CA, USA || TKO (Right Back Kick) || 5 || 1:59 
|-
|-  bgcolor="#CCFFCC"
| 1998-06-27 || Win ||align=left| Maurice Travis ||  || Los Angeles, CA, USA || Decision || 5 || 3:00
|-
! style=background:white colspan=9 |
|-
|-  bgcolor="#CCFFCC"
| 1998-04-26 || Win ||align=left| Changpuek Kiatsongrit || Shooto "Shoot the Shooto XX" || Tokyo, Japan || Decision (Unanimous) || 3 || 3:00
|-
|-  bgcolor="#c5d2ea"
| 1996-07-14 || Draw ||align=left| Yarsin Loogklongtan || Shoot Boxing - S-Cup 1996, Super Fight || Tokyo, Japan || 2 Ext.R Decision Draw || 5 || 3:00
|-
|-  bgcolor="#c5d2ea"
| 1996-01-27 || Draw ||align=left| Yoji Anjo || Shoot Boxing Carnival Ground Zero Yokohama|| Yokohama, Japan || Decision Draw || 1 || 20:00
|-
|-
|-  bgcolor="#CCFFCC"
| 1995-10-15 || Win ||align=left| Luc Verheye |||MA Japan Kickboxing Federation  || Tokyo, Japan || Decision || 5 || 3:00
|-  bgcolor="#CCFFCC"
|-
|-  bgcolor="#CCFFCC"
| 1995-03-25 || Win ||align=left| Bartolomeo Danbrosio || World Cup Of Martial arts || Ledyard, CT, USA || KO || 1 || 0:31 
|-  bgcolor="#CCFFCC"
| 1994-06-10 || Win ||align=left| Taro Minato || || Tulsa, Oklahoma, USA || KO || 3 || 2:34
|-
! style=background:white colspan=9 |
|-  bgcolor="#CCFFCC"
| 1994-00-00 || Win ||align=left| Sergei Mayfat || HardKnock 4 || Atlantic City, NJ, USA || Decision || 10 || 2:00
|-
|-  bgcolor="#FFBBBB"
| 1993-12-29 || Loss ||align=left| Ernesto Hoost || K-2 Grand Prix '93, Quarter Final || Tokyo, Japan || Ext.R Decision (Majority) || 4 || 3:00
|-
|-  bgcolor="#CCFFCC"
| 1993-01-30 || Win ||align=left| Taro Minato ||MA Japan Kickboxing Federation || Tokyo, Japan || Decision || 5 || 3:00
|-
|-  bgcolor="#FFBBBB"
| 1992-07-30 || Loss ||align=left| Taiei Kin || Seidokaikan Kakutogi Olympic II || Tokyo, Japan || DQ (Illegal Punch) || 4 || 
|-
|-  bgcolor="#CCFFCC"
| 1992-03-21 || Win ||align=left| Sajitkan || Martial Arts Japan Kickboxing Association || Japan || TKO (Spinning High Kick) || 2 || 
|-
|-  bgcolor="#CCFFCC"
| 0000-00-00 || Win ||align=left| Luc Verheye || || Tokyo, Japan || Decision || 5 || 3:00
|-
|-  bgcolor="#CCFFCC"
| 1990-07-06 || Win ||align=left| Hideo Suzuki ||'90 Kakutougi no saiten || Tokyo, Japan || KO || 2 || 1:58
|-
|-
|-  bgcolor="#CCFFCC"
| 1990-07-01 || Win ||align=left| Naoyuki Taira ||Shoot boxing BATTLE GAME || Tokyo, Japan || KO || 4 || 4:01
|-
! style=background:white colspan=9 |
|-
|-  bgcolor="#CCFFCC"
| 1990-01-03 || Win ||align=left| Koichi Koide || Dojo 20th Anniversary kick || Tokyo, Japan || KO || 1 || 
|-
|-  bgcolor="#CCFFCC"
| 0000-00-00 || Win ||align=left| Johnny Davis || || United States || KO || 9 ||
|-
|-
! style=background:white colspan=9 |
|-
|-  bgcolor="#CCFFCC"
| 1989-05-26 || Win ||align=left| Caesar Takeshi || Tokyo Korakuen Hall Shoot Boxing || Tokyo, Japan || KO (Spinning Mid Kick) || 1 || 4:28
|-
! style=background:white colspan=9 |
|-
|-  bgcolor="#FFBBBB"
| 1989-04-01 || Loss ||align=left| Rick Roufus || || United States || Decision || ||
|-
|-  bgcolor="#FFBBBB"
| 1987-00-00 || Loss ||align=left| Rick Roufus ||  || United States || Decision || ||
|-
|-
| colspan=9 | Legend:

Mixed martial arts record

|-
|-  bgcolor="#FFBBBB"
| 2006-08-28 || Loss ||align=left| Jeremy Morrison || Combat Do Fighting Challenge 10 || Cicero, IL, USA || Submission (Rear Naked Choke) || 1 || 0:05
|-
|-
| colspan=9 | Legend:

See also 
List of male kickboxers
List of K-1 Events

References

External links
Official K-1 website
Manson Gibson K-1 profile

1963 births
Living people
American male kickboxers
American male mixed martial artists
Mixed martial artists utilizing Tang Láng Quán
Mixed martial artists utilizing Muay Thai
Mixed martial artists utilizing taekwondo
Kickboxers from Illinois
Middleweight kickboxers
Light heavyweight kickboxers
Cruiserweight kickboxers
American Muay Thai practitioners
American wushu practitioners
American male taekwondo practitioners
Sportspeople from Chicago
African-American sportsmen
21st-century African-American people
20th-century African-American sportspeople